José Manuel Aja Livchich (born 10 May 1993) is an Uruguayan professional footballer who plays for Independiente Santa Fe.

Club career
Aja began his career with Nacional in 2014, also spending time on loan with Racing Club during the 2015–16 season. He went on loan to Major League Soccer side Orlando City on 21 July 2016.

On 24 February 2018, Aja was traded to Vancouver Whitecaps FC in exchange for $125,000 of Targeted Allocation Money and a conditional second-round pick in the 2021 MLS SuperDraft. Aja was released by Vancouver at the end of their 2018 season.

On 14 February 2020, Aja was signed by Minnesota United FC. He made his debut for Minnesota United on 12 July 2020 against Sporting Kansas City in the MLS is Back Tournament. When the COVID-19 pandemic in the United States forced play to resume play with the MLS is Back Tournament tournament, Aja took on a major role in defence with the absence of other players, but his contract option was not exercised at the end of the season.

Aja moved to Santiago Wanderers in the Primera Division de Chile, spending a short time there before moving to River Plate of the Uruguayan Primera División, where he made nine appearances. He was then transferred to Independiente Santa Fe.

References

External links
 
 

1993 births
Living people
Uruguayan footballers
Uruguayan expatriate footballers
Footballers from Montevideo
Association football defenders
Club Nacional de Football players
Orlando City SC players
Vancouver Whitecaps FC players
Racing Club de Montevideo players
Club Atlético River Plate (Montevideo) players
Unión Española footballers
Minnesota United FC players
Expatriate footballers in Chile
Expatriate soccer players in Canada
Expatriate soccer players in the United States
Chilean Primera División players
Uruguayan Primera División players
Major League Soccer players
Uruguayan expatriate sportspeople in Chile
Uruguayan expatriate sportspeople in Canada
Uruguayan expatriate sportspeople in the United States